Altacreodus ("creodont from Alberta") is an extinct genus of eutherian mammals. Fossils have been found in North America where they first appeared during the Late Cretaceous, and they died out prior to the start of the Paleocene.

The type species is "Cimolestes" magnus, which was renamed Altacreodus magnus in 2015. Recent phylogenetic analyses suggests that genus Altacreodus is a member of clade Pan-Carnivora and the closest known sister taxon to genus Tinerhodon and the order Hyaenodonta. In some studies its position as a crown-group placental has been equivocal.

Phylogeny 
The phylogenetic relationships of genus Altacreodus are shown in the following cladogram.

See also 
 Mammal classification
 Ferae

References 

†
Prehistoric eutherians
Cretaceous mammals of North America
Hell Creek fauna
Fossil taxa described in 2015